Friedrich Alexander Maria "Fritz" Mandl (9 February 1900 – 8 September 1977) was chairman of Hirtenberger Patronen-Fabrik, a leading Austrian armaments firm founded by his father, Alexander Mandl.

A prominent fascist, Mandl was attached to the Austrofascism and Italian varieties and an opponent of Nazism. In the 1930s he became close to Prince Ernst Rüdiger Starhemberg, the commander of the Austrian nationalist militia ("Heimwehr"), which he furnished with weapons and ammunition. He inherited the weapons factory from his father, Alexander Mandl, which was used to help equip Hitler's Germany. Until 1940, Mandl tried to maintain contact with Hermann Göring's office in order to supply Germany with iron.

Private life
Mandl was born on 9 February 1900, in Vienna, Austria-Hungary, the son of a Jewish father and a Catholic mother: Alexander Mandl (1861–1943) and Maria Mohr (1873–1924).

Mandl was married five times. His wives were:
 Helene Hella Mandl (née Strauss; born 1899, Vienna to whom he was married at the age of 21 – the marriage lasted for six weeks.
 In August 1933, he married 18 year old Austrian actress Hedwig "Hedy" Kiesler, who had sparked controversy after her appearance in the infamous film Ecstasy (1933), in which she appeared nude for a few seconds and reportedly simulated sexual intercourse and orgasm. Mandl demanded on the occasion of their wedding in the Vienna Karlskirche that she convert to Catholicism, which she did. (Both of Kiesler's parents were born Jewish, though her mother would later convert to Catholicism.) Mandl is rumoured to have attempted to bring a halt to her acting career in Germany. He reportedly spent US$280,000 ($ in  dollars) in an unsuccessful attempt to suppress the film Ecstasy by purchasing every existing print. In her autobiography, Ecstasy and Me, Lamarr described Mandl as extremely controlling, and wrote that she escaped from him by disguising herself as a maid and fleeing to Paris, where she obtained a divorce. Kiesler would later become known as Hedy Lamarr and became a major star in Hollywood.
 Herta Mandl (née Wrany; born 1911, Steiermark – unknown date of death). (The LaVoz article suggests she was also known as Schneider, and was with him in Buenos Aires in 1938.) They married in 1939 and divorced in 1951.
 Gloria de Quaranta (née Vinelli; born 1922, Buenos Aires, Argentina – died 1976). They married in 1951, and later divorced.
 Monika Brücklmeier, daughter of Eduard Brücklmeier, an accessory executed for his involvement in the July 20 plot to assassinate Hitler. Monika Brücklmeier survived her husband.

Business affairs
Lamarr later wrote in Ecstasy and Me, that both Italian dictator Benito Mussolini and German dictator Adolf Hitler attended Mandl's parties. However, Mandl had a personal quarrel with the Nazi minister Hermann Göring which, as well as his Jewish descent, led to the expropriation of his property in Europe. After the Anschluss of Austria by Nazi Germany in March 1938, Mandl transferred as many of his assets as he could to Swiss ownership, resigned as director-general of the munitions company and fled to Switzerland. He was forced to sell his business for £170,000 and 1.24 million Sperrmark to the German Wilhelm Gustloff Stiftung. The remaining property was seized.

In exile
Some time in the mid-1940s, Mandl moved to Brazil and then to Argentina. He arrived in Argentina as a "refugee", with his Rolls-Royce, a court of maintainers, and a ton of gold bullion. He became a citizen and remarried in 1951. In Argentina he opened factories and companies during Peronism.

In Argentina, he served as an advisor to Juan Perón and attempted a new role as film producer. He also founded a new airplane manufacturing firm, Industria Metalúrgica y Plástica Argentina. Mandl became a leading member of Argentina's social circles. He acquired a home in Mar del Plata, a castle in Córdoba and a small hotel in Buenos Aires. He worked closely with French designer Jean-Michel Frank, who was then artistic director of Comte S.A., who produced most of Mandl's furnishings.

Return to Austria
Mandl had to close his businesses in Argentina when Americans harassed him on suspicion of his being a Nazi. In 1955 after the fall of peronism in Argentina, he left for Austria where he resumed running the factory at Hirtenberg. He died in Vienna in 1977. After his death, a dispute broke out over his inheritance that took years to resolve.

References

General references 
 Bill, Ramón. Waffenfabrik Solothurn. Schweizerische Präzision im Dienste der deutschen Rüstungsindustrie. In: Schriftenreihe des Kantonalen Museums Altes Zeughaus Solothurn, Heft 14. Solothurn, 2002
 Hug, Peter. Schweizer Rüstungsindustrie und Kriegsmaterialhandel zur Zeit des Nationalsozialismus. Unternehmensstrategien – Marktentwicklung – politische Überwachung. Zurich: Chronos Verlag, Band 11 der Publikationen der Unabhängigen Expertenkommission, 2002.
 Kerekes, Lajos. Abenddämmerung einer Demokratie. Mussolini, Gömbös und die Heimwehr. Wien-Frankfurt-Zürich: Europa Verlag, 1966.
 Louçã, António. Conspiradores e traficantes. Portugal no tráfico de armas e de divisas nos anos do nazismo. 1933–1945. Lisbon: Oficina do Livro, 2005.
 Hanauska, Fritz. Heimatbuch der Marktgemeinde Hirtenberg. Marktgemeinde Hirtenberg, Hirtenberg 1980

External links 
 https://read.dukeupress.edu/hahr/article/66/3/541/148247/The-Neutralization-of-Fritz-Mandl-Notes-on-Wartime

1900 births
1977 deaths
20th-century Austrian businesspeople
Austrian people of Jewish descent
20th-century Argentine businesspeople
Austrian emigrants to Argentina
Arms traders
Austrofascists
Controversies in Austria